Behnamvasat-e Shomali Rural District is in the Central District of Varamin County, Tehran province, Iran. At the National Census of 2006, its population was 10,884 in 2,630 households. There were 11,138 inhabitants in 3,112 households at the following census of 2011. At the most recent census of 2016, the population of the rural district was 11,486 in 3,431 households. The largest of its 23 villages was Ahmadabad-e Vasat, with 2,933 people.

References 

Varamin County

Rural Districts of Tehran Province

Populated places in Tehran Province

Populated places in Varamin County